Members of the New South Wales Legislative Council who served from 1861 to 1864 were appointed for life by the Governor on the advice of the Premier. The 1855 Constitution of New South Wales provided that the first council was appointed for a period of 5 years, but that subsequent members would be appointed for life.  The previous council had ended in controversy with an attempt was made to swamp the chamber by appointing 21 new members in May 1861, because the council had rejected the Robertson land bills. When the council met and the new members were waiting to be sworn in, the President Sir William Burton stated that he felt he had been treated with discourtesy in the matter, resigned his office of president and his membership, and left the chamber. 19 other members also resigned in protest. In the absence of the President and Chairman of Committees, under the standing orders the council was adjourned. There were no further sitting days before the terms of the members of council had expired.

Of the 38 members prior to the attempted swamping, 12 were re-appointed, including just 4 of the 20 who had resigned in protest. The Robertson Land Acts were passed by the Council on 17 October 1861.

This list includes members between the end of the initial terms on 13 May 1861 and the beginning of the 1864–65 colonial election on 22 November 1864. The President was William Wentworth until 10 October 1862 and then Terence Murray.

See also
Third Cowper ministry (1861–1863)
First Martin ministry (1863–1865)

Notes

References

 

Members of New South Wales parliaments by term
19th-century Australian politicians